These are the results of the men's team competition in badminton at the 2011 Southeast Asian Games in Jakarta.

Medalists

Draw

First round

Quarterfinal

Semifinal

Final

References 

Badminton at the 2011 Southeast Asian Games